Peter Heard is president and ex-chairman of Colchester United Football Club, a Football Association councillor and former FA board member. He was born in Colchester, and used to be a referee.

As the representative for Football League Division One he failed in his attempt to be re-elected to the FA Board after Colchester were promoted to the Championship in 2006.  He sold his controlling stake in the club to Robbie Cowling in August 2006, although he remained as chairman. 
He resigned as chairman in July 2007.

He is a qualified chartered surveyor.

References 

Living people
Colchester United F.C.
English football chairmen and investors
People educated at Forest School, Walthamstow
Year of birth missing (living people)